The Black Prince Limestone is a geologic formation in Arizona. It preserves fossils dating back to the Carboniferous period.

See also

 List of fossiliferous stratigraphic units in Arizona
 Paleontology in Arizona

References
 

Carboniferous Arizona
Carboniferous southern paleotropical deposits